The California toad (Anaxyrus boreas halophilus) is a subspecies of the western toad, along with the boreal toad. The California toad lives throughout the state of California, with the exception of south-eastern desert regions. Like the boreal toad, it feeds on a wide variety of insects and invertebrates. Its diet includes grasshoppers, beetles, flies, and mosquitos.

Etymology 

The scientific name is Anaxyrus boreas halophilus. Boreas is from the Greek word boreas which means “north wind” or “northern”, halophilus from the Greek halos meaning “sea” or “salt”, and philos meaning “having affinity for”.

Identification 

The California toad is less blotched (reduced dorsal melanin) than the boreal toad. It has a wider head, larger eyes, smaller feet, and a weaker development of the margins along the dorsal stripe. The largest western toad larvae at 56 mm is also of the California toad. The toad has a wide range of dorsal coloration, from light gray to green to dull black; most however are brownish gray. The California toad, as a western toad, walks rather than hops  The adult size range is two to five inches.

Habitat and distribution 

The California toad occurs from all of Northern California and down south into Baja California. There are scattered populations in isolated desert areas, such as in the Mojave Desert, but they generally do not occur in the desert areas from Death Valley southward. The habitats for the California toad range from woodland, grassland, and meadows in forest areas to backyards and parks in the suburbs. It breeds in lakes, creeks, ponds, reservoirs, slowly flowing streams, and canals.

Reproduction 

The California toad breeds from January to July, with later spawning occurring at higher elevations. Many populations are aggregation breeders that come to suitable marsh or pond spawning sites in large numbers. Here males recognize females through random amplexus. Eggs number over 16,000 per female and are laid in strings in shallow water.

References 

Fauna of California
Fauna of the Western United States
Anaxyrus